Meet Jain is an Indian playback singer, composer, and lyricist in the Hindi and Gujarati film industry. He became a part of the Indian reality singing show, The Voice Season 1 in the year 2015, where he was mentored by singer Shaan.

Personal life

Meet was born and brought up in Ahmedabad, Gujarat in a family of professors. He went to Aroma High School and holds a master's degree in Industrial Biotechnology, from Sardar Patel University in Vallabh Vidyanagar. He is a well-trained vocalist, pianist, and guitarist and is doing stage performances from the age of 12.

Music career

Meet sings for both Gujarati and Hindi industry. His career threw a bounce when in 2013 he was entitled as the winner of 'Idea Rocks India, Ahmedabad' where he shared the stage with Mika Singh. 
He is also known to sing for big business banner advertisements of TATA and ADANI in Gujarati language.

Meet was a contestant in the 5th Edition of Sony TV Entertainment Ke Liye Kuch Bhi Karega, judged by Farah Khan and Anu Malik. Later, in 2015 his band made it to a reality show "MTV Never Hide Sound" with Rahul Ram (Indian Ocean Band) as their mentor.

In June 2015, he participated in The Voice season 1, the Indian reality TV show. He was chosen to be a part of Shaan's team and was eliminated during the battle rounds. Moreover, due to his popularity in the show, he got a chance to host the show "The Voice India" as well, with Karan Tacker. Also, he shares a special bond with actor and host Arjun Bijlani, due to this got a chance to play his friend on a special episode of Dance Deewane 2. There, he sung for Arjun and even shared the stage with Madhuri Dixit, Tushar Kalia, and Shashank Khaitan.

Till the time he has performed in more than 1100 shows worldwide and has given his voice to several Gujarati songs, his most popular one is Radha Khovai in which he featured alongside Shraddha Dangar.

He has also composed several Gujarati songs such as Radha Khovai, Nach Mari Saathe (title song) and E Memo.

In 2019, Meet Jain got the chance to speak at the TEDx event, held at Great Lakes Institute of Management, Chennai.

Meet has done playback singing for more than 25 Gujarati albums and movies including Ghar Ek Mandir, Kalyug No Kanho, Armaan, Superstar, Bau Na Vichar, and Ambe Maat Ni.

Albums / Singles

References

External links 
 https://www.youtube.com/user/meetjain103/videos
 The Voice (Indian season 1)

Indian composers
Bollywood playback singers
Indian male playback singers
21st-century Indian male singers
21st-century Indian singers
Living people
Year of birth missing (living people)